Emanuele Di Gregorio (born 13 December 1980 in Castellammare del Golfo, Sicily) is a track and field sprint athlete who competes internationally for Italy.

Biography
Di Gregorio represented Italy at the 2008 Summer Olympics in Beijing. He competed in the 4×100 metres relay together with Fabio Cerutti, Simone Collio and Jacques Riparelli. In their qualification heat they were disqualified and eliminated. He achieved a new personal best at the 2009 European Athletics Indoor Championships in Turin with a 6.56-second run for the 60 metres dash. A photo-finish revealed he came in third just ahead of Great Britain's Simeon Williamson (6.57).

He succeeded at the regional level with a silver medal in the 100 m at the 2009 Mediterranean Games, before adding the relay gold to his honours. He ran at the 2009 World Championships in Athletics, reaching the 100 m quarter-finals and he also helped the men's 4×100 metres relay team to sixth in the final.

He ran a personal best in the 100 m at the 2010 European Athletics Championships, finishing in 10.17 seconds into a headwind to earn himself a place in the event final. He finished seventh in his first major outdoor final. He scored his first Italian record in the 100 m relay event with the men's team, who took the silver behind France in a record time of 38.17 seconds.

See also
 Italian all-time lists - 100 metres
 Italy national relay team

References

External links
 

1980 births
Living people
Italian male sprinters
Olympic athletes of Italy
Athletes (track and field) at the 2008 Summer Olympics
People from Castellammare del Golfo
Athletics competitors of Centro Sportivo Aeronautica Militare
European Athletics Championships medalists
Mediterranean Games gold medalists for Italy
Mediterranean Games silver medalists for Italy
Athletes (track and field) at the 2009 Mediterranean Games
World Athletics Championships athletes for Italy
Mediterranean Games medalists in athletics
Italian Athletics Championships winners
Sportspeople from the Province of Trapani